Behavior Therapy is a quarterly peer-reviewed academic journal covering behavior therapy. It was established in 1970 and is published by Elsevier. The editor-in-chief is Denise M. Sloan (Boston University School of Medicine). According to the Journal Citation Reports, the journal has a 2017 impact factor of 3.228.

References

External links

Elsevier academic journals
Quarterly journals
Publications established in 1970
English-language journals
Psychotherapy journals